Lyadov is a Russian male surname, its feminine counterpart is Lyadova. It may refer to:
Anatoly Lyadov (1855–1914), Russian composer and conductor
Viktor Lyadov (born 1966), Russian pianist
Yury Lyadov (born 1987), Belarusian Olympic biathlon competitor
Elena Lyadova (born 1980), Russian actress
Lyubov Lyadova (born 1952), Russian cross-country skier 
Lyudmila Lyadova (1925–2021), Russian composer

Russian-language surnames